The women's 63 kilograms (Half middleweight) competition at the 2018 Asian Games in Jakarta was held on 30 August at the Jakarta Convention Center Assembly Hall.

Nami Nabekura of Japan won the gold medal.

Schedule
All times are Western Indonesia Time (UTC+07:00)

Results

Main bracket

Repechage

References

External links
 
 Official website
 Official website

W63
Judo at the Asian Games Women's Half Middleweight
Asian W63